Zhanghuai may refer to:

Prince Zhanghuai, Tang dynasty prince
Princess Pan, or Empress Zhanghuai, Song dynasty empress